Andrew Jacob Puk (born April 25, 1995) is an American professional baseball pitcher for the Miami Marlins of Major League Baseball (MLB). He has previously played in MLB for the Oakland Athletics. He played college baseball for the Florida Gators.

Amateur career
Puk attended Washington High School in Cedar Rapids, Iowa. He was a first baseman and pitcher in baseball and also played football as a quarterback. He was drafted by the Detroit Tigers in the 35th round of the 2013 Major League Baseball draft, but did not sign and attended the University of Florida to play college baseball.

As a freshman at Florida, Puk appeared in 19 games and made seven starts. He had a 5–2 win–loss record with a 3.35 earned run average (ERA), 44 strikeouts, and one save. In April 2015, Puk and a teammate were arrested and charged with third-degree criminal trespass after they climbed a crane inside a marked construction site on Florida's campus. The charge was later reduced to a misdemeanor and he was briefly suspended. After the suspension, Puk returned to help lead the Gators to the 2015 College World Series.

Professional career

Oakland Athletics
Puk was ranked among the top prospects for the 2016 Major League Baseball draft in early rankings. The Oakland Athletics selected him in the first round with the sixth overall pick of the draft. He signed a contract with a $4,069,200 signing bonus and was assigned to the Vermont Lake Monsters of the Class A Short-Season New York-Penn League. He finished the 2016 season with a 0–4 record and a 3.03 ERA in 10 starts. Puk spent 2017 with the Stockton Ports of the Class A-Advanced California League and the Midland RockHounds of the Class AA Texas League, pitching in 27 games (24 starts), posting a combined 6–10 record with a 4.03 ERA, along with 184 strikeouts in 124 innings pitched, between both teams. On April 11, 2018, Puk underwent Tommy John surgery, forcing him to miss the 2018 season. Puk began the 2019 season with Midland, and was promoted to the Las Vegas Aviators of the Class AAA Pacific Coast League during the season. 

On August 20, the Athletics promoted Puk to the major leagues. Puk made his major league debut against the New York Yankees on August 21, retiring one of three batters faced. Puk earned his first career win on September 5, 2019, pitching two innings in relief with one earned run and two strikeouts. Puk finished the season with a 2–0 record with a 3.18 ERA and 13 strikeouts in 10 appearances (11 innings pitched).

On September 6, 2020, Puk continued to have lingering issues in his throwing shoulder during training. On September 11, 2020, Athletic's manager Bob Melvin officially shut him down for the season. He was scheduled to have shoulder surgery on September 16, 2020. 

In 2021, Puk appeared in 12 games for Oakland, registering an 0-3 record and 6.08 ERA with 16 strikeouts in 13.1 innings pitched. After being stretched out as a starter in Spring Training in 2022, Puk returned to the bullpen, appearing in 62 contests for the Athletics. In 66.1 innings pitched, he worked to a 4-3 record and 3.12 ERA with 4 saves and 76 strikeouts.

Miami Marlins
On February 11, 2023, the Athletics traded Puk to the Miami Marlins in exchange for JJ Bleday.

International career
In the summer of 2015, Puk played for the United States collegiate national team. Against Cuba, Puk, Tanner Houck and Ryan Hendrix combined to throw a no-hitter.

References

External links

Florida Gators bio

1995 births
Living people
Sportspeople from Cedar Rapids, Iowa
Baseball players from Iowa
Major League Baseball pitchers
Oakland Athletics players
Florida Gators baseball players
Vermont Lake Monsters players
Stockton Ports players
Midland RockHounds players
Las Vegas Aviators players
Waterloo Bucks players